Greg Cross is a former professional rugby league footballer who played in the 1970s. He is the brother of former North Sydney Bears , Peter Cross.

References

Manly Warringah Sea Eagles players
Living people
Year of birth missing (living people)